Livadi beach is located in Ferma, 10 kilometers east of Ierapetra, in Crete. Next to the beach are the most hotels.

Livadi is a small cove with pebbles and crystal clear waters. It is semi-organized beach with an amazing landscape of lush vegetation, tall cliffs and steep cliffs.

References
Beaches ierapetra.net
Beaches near Ierapetra explorecrete.com
Beach of Ferma cretanbeaches.com

Beaches of Crete
Landforms of Lasithi